"Flashes" is a 1931 jazz composition for solo piano by cornetist Bix Beiderbecke. It is the third work in a series of four compositions for piano composed by Bix Beiderbecke during his career.

Background
Bix Beiderbecke did not record "Flashes" himself but copyrighted the composition on April 18, 1931, along with "In the Dark", also a piano work, as "A Modern Composition for the Piano". Bill Challis assisted with the transcription for piano. "Flashes was recorded by jazz pianist Jess Stacy on November 15, 1935. Jazz trumpeter Bunny Berigan recorded it in 1939 and released it as a 78 single on RCA Victor, 26121-A. In 2010, pianist Bryan Wright recorded the work on piano along with the three other piano compositions by Bix Beiderbecke, "In a Mist", "Candlelight", and "In the Dark".

In 2020, Juliet Kurtzman and Pete Malinverni recorded an arrangement of "Flashes" for violin and piano on the album Candlelight: Love in the Time of Cholera.

Notable recordings

The composition has been recorded by Jess Stacy, Bunny Berigan, Ry Cooder, Dick Hyman, Patrick Artero in 2006, Bernd Lhotzky, Bryan Wright, Dill Jones, jazz guitarist Bucky Pizzarelli on his 1986 Stash album Solo Flight, Geff Muldaur in 2003, Helmut Nieberle in 2005, and Tony Caramia on the 2005 album Zebra Stripes.

Album appearances
Bix Beiderbecke: Bix Restored, Vol. 1, Origin Records, 1995  
Bix Beiderbecke: In a Mist: His Best Works, Definitive Classics, 2007
Geoff Muldaur: Geoff Muldaur's Futuristic Ensemble: Private Astronomy: A Vision of the Music of Bix Beiderbecke, Shefa, 2003
Juliet Kurtzman and Pete Malinverni: Candlelight: Love in the Time of Cholera, 2020

Sources

Berton, Ralph. Remembering Bix. Harper & Row, 1974. 
Castelli, Vittorio, Evert (Ted) Kaleveld, and Liborio Pusateri. The Bix Bands: A Bix Beiderbecke Disco-biography. Raretone, Milan, 1972. 
Collins, David R. Bix Beiderbecke: Jazz Age Genius. Morgan Reynolds, Inc., Greensboro, North Carolina, 1998. 
Evans, Philip R. and Linda K. Evans. Bix: The Leon Bix Beiderbecke Story. Bakersfield, Calif.: Prelike Press, 1998. . 
Lastella, Aldo. "La vita e la leggenda di Bix Beiderbecke". Nuovi Equilibri S.R.L., Roma, 1991.

Instrumentals
Compositions for solo piano
1931 songs